is a 2016 Japanese anime television series animated by Zexcs, adapted from the novel written by Shion Miura. The series was directed by Toshimasa Kuroyanagi and written by Takuya Satō, featuring original character designs by Haruko Kumota, adapted character designs by Hiroyuki Aoyama and music by Yoshihiro Ike. The anime aired between October 14, 2016 and December 23, 2016 on Fuji TV's Noitamina block.

Plot
The publication of a new dictionary called The Great Passage is being constructed.  Mitsuya Majime, originally from publisher Genbu Publishing's sales department, has been recruited by the retiring editor of the dictionary department Kouhei Araki to succeed him due to his love and dedication to reading. The dictionary department is known internally as the "money-eating insect" (loss making), but Mitsuya uses his perseverance and attachment to the words in order to become a great editor.

Characters

Majime is the main protagonist. He is a sales man for Genbu until Araki transfers him to the Dictionary Editorial Department. He is a bookworm and has a hard time expressing his own feelings, though he does make a conscious effort of learning how to. He has feelings for Kaguya which is why he writes a confession letter for her and asks Nishioka to advice him regarding it. After the time skip, it is revealed that he has married her, and has become the Chief editor of the Dictionary Editorial Department.

Nishioka is a good looking and friendly guy who is one of the editors at the Dictionary Editorial Department, before he gets transferred to the PR Department. When he first meets Majime he thinks that the latter is weird, but when they start working together they come to realize that their individual strengths complement each other. They eventually become best friends. After the time skip, it is revealed that he has become the chief of the PR Department, and that he regularly tries to help out the Dictionary Editorial Department to make "The Great Passage" a success.

Kaguya is the granddaughter of Take, Majime's landlord. She is training to become a Japanese chef and responds favourably when Majime confesses to her. After the time skip it is revealed that she has married Majime, and now owns her own restaurant.

He is the former Chief of the Dictionary Editorial Department who has decided to retire due to his wife's illness. He swears to Matsumoto-sensei that he would find someone worthy to take his place, and after he brings Majime in, Matsumoto-sensei and he find Majime to be exactly that. He keeps mentoring Majime and becomes a part-time employee.

 

Sasaki is the secretary of the Dictionary Editorial Department. She is a mild mannered woman, who continues to support the editors at the department.

Kishibe is a character who is introduced after the time skip. She is transferred from the Northern Black Editorial Team, and at first finds it difficult to adjust to her new role and environment. But with Nishioka's help she manages that, and also contributes to the completion and publication of "The Great Passage".

Miyoshi works at the PR Department, and is secretly in a relationship with Nishioka, with whom she also went to High School. After the time skip, it is revealed that she has married him (which now makes her Remi Nishioka) and they have two daughters together.

Matsumoto, or Matsumoto-sensei as he is called by the others, is a professor who serves in an advisory capacity for the compilation of "The Great Passage" at the Dictionary Editorial Department at Genbu. He is a wise and kindhearted man, who also loves learning new words, which he writes down in a notebook he carries with him at all times.

Take is Majime's landlord and Kaguya's grandmother. She is a gentle soul who often stays up late only to converse with Majime and offer him her leftovers.

Media

Anime
The series was produced by Fuji TV, Aniplex, Kyoraku Industrial Holdings, Kansai Telecasting Corporation, Kobunsha, Dentsu, and Zexcs. It premiered in the Noitamina programming block on Fuji TV on October 14, 2016, and finished airing on December 23, 2016 with a total of 11 episodes. Amazon simulcasted the series on their Amazon Video service. The series will be released across two home video release volumes which are scheduled for release on January 25, 2017 and March 22, 2017, respectively; the first volume contains episodes 1 to 7, and the second volume contains episode 8 to 11.

Episode list

Notes

References

External links
 

Anime based on novels
Anime Strike
Discotek Media
Noitamina
Television shows based on Japanese novels
Works about book publishing and bookselling
Zexcs